María Serrano Serrano (born 5 April 1957 in San Javier, Sinaloa) is a Mexican politician and member of the Partido Acción Nacional ("National Action Party", PAN).

She was elected Senator for Sinaloa in the 2006 Mexican general election, succeeding Heriberto Félix Guerra in the post.

She is a graduate of University of Guadalajara.

References 

Members of the Senate of the Republic (Mexico)
People from Sinaloa
National Action Party (Mexico) politicians
University of Guadalajara alumni
1957 births
Living people
Women members of the Senate of the Republic (Mexico)
21st-century Mexican politicians
21st-century Mexican women politicians